Panagiotis Markopoulos (1916–1996) was a Greek politician. He was three times Minister of the Interior of Greece (1984, 1985, 1989). He was acting minister of public order (1989).

References

1916 births
1996 deaths
Ministers of the Interior of Greece
Ministers of Public Order of Greece